Ekaphan Inthasen (born September 23, 1983) is a Thai retired professional footballer who played as a winger. He previously played for two other clubsides in Thailand and Vietnam. He won the Thailand Premier League title with Chonburi in 2007, followed by the Kor Royal Cup in 2008 in which has earned himself a call up to the Thailand national football team.

Club career

Ekaphan born in Surat Thani and attended Suratthani state secondary school. Ekaphan began his career in the youth team of his home club Surat Thani F.C. at the age of 16 years. In 2002, he joined the youth team of the Bangkok Bank and played from 2004 for the seniors section of the club. In 2006, he went to Vietnam for a season to Nam Dinh F.C. in the V.League. But even there he could win a title with the club, finishing in ninth place at the end of the table. He then returned to Thailand to Bangkok Bank. At the start of the 2008 season, he joined the then reigning champions Chonburi F.C., for whom he played until today. With him he previously won two Super Cups, and was runner-2008. In the 2008 AFC Champions League, he came here five times for use. In 2009, he plays with his current club in the AFC Cup.

International career

for the national team, he was in the 2005 U-21 squad and the U-23 squad for the Southeast Asian Games. [1] [2] In the Southeast Asian Games in 2005 he won the gold medal with the U-23rd. In 2004 Ekaphan had his first missions for the seniors team. But could still not been established in the national team squad.

International goals

Under-19

Thailand

Honours

Club
Chonburi
 Thai Premier League: 2007
 Thai FA Cup: 2010
 Kor Royal Cup: 2008, 2009, 2011

International
Thailand U-19
 AFF U-20 Youth Championship: 2002

Thailand U-23
 Sea Games Gold Medal: 2005

References

External links
 Profile at Goal

1981 births
Living people
Ekaphan Inthasen
Ekaphan Inthasen
Association football wingers
Ekaphan Inthasen
Ekaphan Inthasen
Ekaphan Inthasen
Ekaphan Inthasen
Ekaphan Inthasen
Ekaphan Inthasen
Ekaphan Inthasen
V.League 1 players
Thai expatriate footballers
Thai expatriate sportspeople in Vietnam
Expatriate footballers in Vietnam
Ekaphan Inthasen
Footballers at the 2006 Asian Games
Ekaphan Inthasen
Southeast Asian Games medalists in football
Competitors at the 2005 Southeast Asian Games
Ekaphan Inthasen